The Karkin language (also called Los Carquines in Spanish) is an extinct Ohlone language. It was formerly spoken in north central California, but by the 1950s there were no more native speakers. The language was historically spoken by the Karkin people, who lived in the Carquinez Strait region in the northeast portion of the San Francisco Bay estuary.

Karkin's only documentation is a single vocabulary obtained by linguist-missionary Felipe Arroyo de la Cuesta at Mission Dolores in 1821.  Although meager, the records of Karkin show that it constituted a distinct branch of Ohlone, strikingly different from the neighboring Chochenyo Ohlone language and other Ohlone languages spoken farther south.

Notes

References
 Beeler, Madison S. 1961.  "Northern Costanoan." International Journal of American Linguistics 27: 191–197.
 Callaghan, Catherine A. 1997. "Evidence for Yok-Utian." International Journal of American Linguistics 63:18–64.
 Golla, Victor. 2007. "Linguistic Prehistory." California Prehistory: Colonization, Culture, and Complexity. Terry L. Jones and Kathryn A. Klar, eds., pp. 71–82. New York: Altamira Press. .
 Milliken, Randall T. 1995. A Time of Little Choice: The Disintegration of Tribal Culture in the San Francisco Bay Region, 1769–1810. Menlo Park, CA: Ballena Press.
 Milliken, Randall T. 2008. Native Americans at Mission San Jose. Banning, CA: Malki-Ballena Press. .

Further reading 

 Callaghan, C.A. 1988. "Karkin Revisited." International Journal of American Linguistics 54: 436–452.

External links
 Karkin language overview at the Survey of California and Other Indian Languages
 Costanoan/Ohlone Indian Language

Ohlone languages
Extinct languages of North America